Linger is a small town in the commune of Bascharage, in south-western Luxembourg.  , the town has a population of 577.

Bascharage
Towns in Luxembourg